Pierre Johan Spies (born 8 June 1985 in Pretoria) is a retired South African rugby union player. He usually played as a Number 8, but could also play as a flanker and at times was deployed on the wing. He represented  internationally between 2006 and 2013.

Personal

Spies was born on 8 June 1985 in Pretoria and attended Afrikaanse Hoër Seunskool (Afrikaans High School for Boys, also known as Affies), a public school located in Pretoria. He attended alongside future Springbok teammates Fourie du Preez and Wynand Olivier, professional rugby players Derick Kuün, Jacques-Louis Potgieter, Gerhard van den Heever, Adriaan Fondse and cricketers AB de Villiers, Heino Kuhn and Faf du Plessis. After school, he completed his first year in B.Sc. Construction Management at the University of Pretoria.

He married Juanne Weidemann, in December 2008. Spies is a devout Christian, but although both his parents are ministers he only started practicing his faith when he was in his twenties.

Rugby

However, he picked up an injury in this match and reverted to the  side, where he scored nine tries in six games in the 2005 Under-21 Provincial Championship.

On 21 July 2007, Spies was selected in Jake White's Springbok squad for the 2007 Rugby World Cup to be played in France in September, but was forced to withdraw from the squad nine days later after blood clots were found in his lungs. After getting a second opinion, it was stated that Spies could return to the World Cup squad if a third opinion was positive. However, the third diagnosis confirmed the original one and Spies withdrew from the squad. He returned to the Springboks' team for the 2008 June internationals against Wales.

In domestic rugby, he was nominated for the 2008 Currie Cup Player of the Year, South African Player of the Year, International Player of the Year and won the award for South Africa's Most Promising Player of the Year and Sportsman of the Year.

In 2009, his performances in the Super 14 earned him a selection for the Springboks to play against the British & Irish Lions during their tour to South Africa. He was also selected for South Africa's end-of-year tour, but injured his finger and was ruled out.

In 2015, after having been released by the Bulls, Spies played a few matches with Japanese club Kintetsu Liners and then moved to top French club Montpellier Hérault Rugby, then coached by the Jake White.

In 2017, after his contract with Montpellier had not been renewed, Spies announced to have decided to retire from rugby.

Physical
As of 2009, Spies could power clean 135 kg, dead-lift 240 kg, bench-press 165 kg and do pull-ups with a 50 kg weight between his legs. He could jump 1.4m onto a raised platform and had a body-fat percentage of 6.5. He was "rumoured" to be able to run 100m in around 11seconds, his speed anyway so high to have been fielded on the wing at times.

Spies was credited with great strength, and pace for his size, but was criticised for a lack of physicality, especially if compared to fellow South African No.8 Duane Vermeulen Injuries hampered his later career.

He was in general regarded more suitable to break the defenders' line and play in the space than being the typical Springbok forward, menacing and physically imposing at the ruck.

References

External links
 
 Pierre Spies on sarugby.com
 Pierre Spies Super 14 Stats
 Pierre Spies Tri-Nations Stats
 Pierre Spies on bluebulls.co.za
 Pierre Spies to debut for the Bulls
 Pierre Spies personal website
 itsrugby.co.uk profile

1985 births
Living people
South African rugby union players
South Africa international rugby union players
Bulls (rugby union) players
Blue Bulls players
Rugby union flankers
Rugby union number eights
Rugby union players from Pretoria
University of Pretoria alumni
Hanazono Kintetsu Liners players
South African expatriate rugby union players
South African expatriate sportspeople in Japan
South African expatriate sportspeople in France
Expatriate rugby union players in Japan
Expatriate rugby union players in France
South African Christians